Men's football took place at the 1995 South Asian Games. India won their third title by defeating Bangladesh in the final by 1–0.

Teams

 (withdrew)

Group stage

Group A

(Q) qualified for Semi-finals.

 withdrew

Matches

Group B

(Q) qualified for Semi-finals

Matches

Semi-final Matches

Medal matches

medal match

match

Winners

References

1995 South Asian Games
1995 South Asian Games